The Grand Tavé (3,158 m) is a mountain of the Swiss Pennine Alps, located south of Fionnay in the canton of Valais. It belongs to the Grand Combin massif and lies east of the Corbassière Glacier.

It lies just south of the Col des Otannes (2,846 m), from where the summit is usually reached.

References

External links
 Grand Tavé on Hikr

Mountains of the Alps
Alpine three-thousanders
Mountains of Switzerland
Mountains of Valais
Bagnes